A Cat May Look at a Queen is an album by Franklin Bruno.  It was released in October 2002 on the Absolutely Kosher label.

Track listing 
Source: Allmusic
All tracks composed by Franklin Bruno; except where noted.

Personnel
Franklin Bruno - electric guitar, synthesizer, piano, organ, keyboards, sampler, vibraphone, grand piano, tapes
Joey Burns - guitar, baritone guitar, vibraphone, shaker, cello (tracks 1-5, 9, 11, 12)
Daniel Brodo - double bass (tracks 1-6, 9-12)
Tommy Larkins - drums (tracks 1-5, 9, 11, 12)
Stefan George - dobro, lap steel guitar (tracks 2, 9)
Amy Domingues - cello (tracks 7, 8)
Winston Watson - bongos (track 11)
Craig Schumacher - harmonica, harmony vocals (tracks 9, 12)
Bill Magdziarz - synthesizer (track 1)
Jacob Valenzuela - trumpet (track 4)

References 

2002 albums
Franklin Bruno albums